The 2008 Campeonato Nacional Clausura Copa Banco Estado  was the 84th Chilean League top flight, in which Colo-Colo won its 28th league title after beating Palestino in the finals. The format is the same as the Apertura tournament, but the field was reduced from 20 teams to 19 since Deportes Concepción withdrew before the start of the tournament due to financial problems.

First stage

Results

Table

Group standings

Group 1

Group 2

Group 3

Group 4

Play-off match

Knock-out round
The clubs were seeded by their first phase standings.

Colo-Colo qualified to the 2009 Copa Libertadores Second Stage.

Top goalscorers

Relegation

Relegation/promotion playoffs

Unión Española & Universidad de Concepción remained at the Primera División.

External links
 RSSSF Chile 2008

Primera División de Chile seasons
Chile
2008 in Chilean football